The Tug of War Outdoor World Championships is a tug of war competition organised by the Tug of War International Federation for national teams. It is the main worldwide competition in the sport and has been held biennially since 2014. TWIF alternates this competition with another biennial world championship, called the TWIF Indoor World Championships for nations.

Venues

Medallists

Men's 580kg (2014-2016) - 560kg (2018-)

Men's 640kg

Men's 680kg

Men's 700kg (2014-2016) - 720kg (2018-)

Women's 500kg

Women's 540kg

Mixed 600kg (2014-2016) - 580kg (2018-)

References

Sources

 

Recurring sporting events established in 2014